Michelle Kroppen (born 19 April 1996) is a German archer. She competed in the women's individual event, and women's team, at the 2020 Summer Olympics, winning a bronze medal.

At the 2018 European Archery Championships held in Legnica, Poland, she won the bronze medal in the women's team recurve event. She won the silver medal in the women's team recurve event at the 2021 European Archery Championships held in Antalya, Turkey.

In 2019, Kroppen and Cedric Rieger won the bronze medal in the mixed team recurve event at the European Games held in Minsk, Belarus. She also competed in the women's individual recurve and women's team recurve events.

She won the silver medal in the women's individual recurve event at the 2022 European Archery Championships held in Munich, Germany. She also won the gold medal in the women's team recurve event and the silver medal in the mixed team recurve event.

References

External links
 

1996 births
Living people
German female archers
Archers at the 2019 European Games
European Games medalists in archery
European Games bronze medalists for Germany
Olympic archers of Germany
Archers at the 2020 Summer Olympics
Olympic medalists in archery
Olympic bronze medalists for Germany
Medalists at the 2020 Summer Olympics
Sportspeople from Düsseldorf (region)
21st-century German women